

Films

References

1986 in LGBT history
1986